Difeh Aqa (also Romanized as Dīfeh Āqā; also known as Daf‘eh, Da’feh Āqā, Da’feh Raẕavī, and Da’feh-ye Āqā) is a village in Koshkuiyeh Rural District, Koshkuiyeh District, Rafsanjan County, Kerman Province, Iran. At the 2006 census, its population was 657, in 157 families.

References 

Populated places in Rafsanjan County